K. H. Sreenivasa was a member of the legislative assembly (1967–1971) from the Sagara constituency of Karnataka state, Bangalore. Veerendra Patil was then Chief Minister of Karnataka.

References
 Election Commission of India Statistical report - 1967 Karnataka state assembly elections

Kannada people
Mysore MLAs 1967–1972
Indian National Congress politicians from Karnataka
People from Shimoga district